The Old Roosevelt Bridge (also called the St. Lucie River Bridge) is a bascule bridge that carries the old Dixie Highway (County Road 707) across the St. Lucie River in Stuart, Florida. It used to have twin parallel bascule drawbridges - one for northbound traffic (opened in 1934), and the other southbound (opened in 1964) - before the new Roosevelt Bridge (US 1) was built. When the new bridge was completed in 1996 the northbound span of the bridge was torn down, leaving the southbound span which now carries traffic in both directions. This bridge was enacted by Roosevelt's New Deal.

Although the rest of the old Dixie Highway adjacent to the bridge has been given to the city of Stuart, the Florida Department of Transportation continues to maintain the bridge as unsigned State Road 707.

References

Bascule bridges in the United States
Transportation buildings and structures in Martin County, Florida
Bridges completed in 1934
Bridges completed in 1964
Road bridges in Florida
Dixie Highway
Bridges of the United States Numbered Highway System
1934 establishments in Florida